Dong Yang (Chinese: 董阳; Pinyin: Dǒng Yáng) (born 14 January 1983) is a Chinese football player.

Club career
Dong began to play organized football in Qinhuangdao Football School and moved to Shanghai Shenhua youth team system in 1998. He was sent to Brazil for further training and promoted to Shanghai Shenhua's first team squad in 2003, however he wouldn't make his debut until the following season. Once he made his debut in the 2004 campaign he failed to establish himself within the first team and made just 10 league appearances for Shanghai Shenhua by the end of the 2008 season. He transferred to China League One side Shanghai Zobon in 2009 and became the captain of the club. He made another move in 2011 when he signed a contract with hometown club Beijing Baxy. He played as a regular player in the center back, scoring 2 goals in 23 appearances in the 2011 season. Dong transferred to Super League side Guizhou Renhe in 2012.

References

External links
Player profile at Sodasoccer.com

Living people
1983 births
Chinese footballers
Footballers from Beijing
Beijing Renhe F.C. players
Shanghai Shenhua F.C. players
Beijing Sport University F.C. players
Pudong Zobon players
Chinese Super League players
China League One players
Association football defenders